Teus Nobel (born at Krimpen aan de Lek in 1982) is a Dutch jazz trumpet player and flugelhorn player. He performs with different bands and is a teacher at Fontys Hogeschool. In 2020 he won an Edison Award for the album Saudade.

Biography 
Teus Nobel studied classical music and jazz at the Codarts University for the Arts in Rotterdam. Here he obtained a bachelor's (2006) and a master's degree, with a research project on the intellectual legacy of jazz trumpeter Woody Shaw.

He has played and toured with the Rotterdam Ska Jazz Foundation, Caro Emerald, The Kyteman Orchestra en Frank McComb. With his own Liberty Group he performed at the North Sea Jazz Festival.

Nobel has published several albums, with Liberty Group and collaborating with Jef Neve en Roeland Jacobs/Radio Filharmonisch Orkest. With Jacobs he won an Edison in 2020 for their Saudade album. 

He has been a teacher at Fontys Academy of Music & Performing Arts since 2020.

Personal life 
Nobel is married and has a son.

Discography 
 Flow (2012)
 Legacy (2014)
 Social Music (met Merlijn Verboom) (2016)
 Journey of Man (2019)
 Pleasure is the Measure (2021)

With Jef Neve:

 Spirit Control (2017)
 Mysterium (2020)

With Roeland Jacobs:

 Saudade (2019) - Edison Jazz/World 2020
 Tanto Amor (2021)

References

External links 
 Teus Nobel website

Dutch jazz trumpeters
Dutch trumpeters
1982 births
Living people